Chengtian Temple is a Buddhist temple located in Licheng District, Quanzhou, Fujian, China. Chengtian Temple is considered one of the Three Great Buddhist Temples in Quanzhou, alongside Kaiyuan Temple and Chongfu Temple.

History

Five Dynasties and Ten Kingdoms
The temple was first built between 957 and 958 with the name of "South Chan Temple", under the Five Dynasties and Ten Kingdoms (907–960). It was the South Garden of Liu Congxiao, a military governor in the Southern Tang dynasty (937–976).

Song dynasty
In 1007, in the reign of Emperor Zhenzong of the Song dynasty (960–1279), the emperor inscribed and honored the name "Chengtian Temple".

Republic of China
In 1947, Chan master Guangqin went to Taiwan to disseminate Buddhism and deliver Buddhist precepts, where he erected the Miaotong Temple, Jinhai Chan Temple, Hengguang Chan Temple, and Guangzhao Temple.

People's Republic of China
In 1966, Mao Zedong launched the ten-year disastrous Cultural Revolution, the red guards ruthlessly attacked the temple, the Hall of Maitreya, Dharma Hall, Bell tower, Drum tower, corridor, hallway, pavilions, and pagodas were destroyed. They were then converted into residential buildings and faculty.

After the 3rd Plenary Session of the 11th Central Committee of the Communist Party of China, the policy of religious freedom was implemented. Chan master Hongchuan returned to Quanzhou and started to restore Chengtian Temple. Renovations and rebuilding to the main buildings (including Mahavira Hall, Dharma Hall, Hall of Maitreya) began in 1985 and were completed in October 1990. The then President of Buddhist Association of China, Upāsaka Zhao Puchu attended the consecration ceremony.

Chengtian Temple was inscribed to the Quanzhou Municipal Cultural Heritage List by the Quanzhou Municipal Government in June 1961. The Stone Dhvaja of Chengtian Temple was listed among the sixth group of Fujian Provincial Historical and Cultural Sites by the Fujian Provincial Government on May 11, 2005.

Architecture
The entire temple faces south with the Four Heavenly Kings Hall, Hall of Maitreya, Free Life Pond, Mahavira Hall, Dharma Hall, Hall of Manjushri along the central axis of the complex. On both sides are the Bell tower, Drum tower, and corridor.

Mahavira Hall
The Mahavira Hall is five rooms wide with double-eaves gable and hip roofs. A 10th-century bronze statue of Sakyamuni from Ancient India is enshrined in the center of the hall.

Stone Dhvaja
It was carved in the Northern Song dynasty (960–1127). It is composed of a sumeru throne, a body and a root crown. The body was engraved patterns of various flying phoenixes, lotuses, Hercules, monsters, etc.

Gallery

References

Buddhist temples in Quanzhou
Buildings and structures in Quanzhou
Tourist attractions in Quanzhou
1990 establishments in China
20th-century Buddhist temples
Religious buildings and structures completed in 1990